Waldbüttelbrunn is a municipality in the district of Würzburg in Lower Franconia, Bavaria, Germany. The population is 5055 (December 2008).

Business
There is a  business park in the north of Waldbüttelbrunn, which provides employment to over 1000 people.

History
Archaeological excavations have shown that the area was settled as early as 5000 BC. The first official document mentioning "Waldbüttelbrunn" as "Büttelbrunn" dates from AD 748.

In 1803 Waldbüttelbrunn, together with the whole area around Würzburg, became part of Bavaria. 
One of the last battles of the Austro-Prussian War of 1866 took place at Rossbrunn, now part of Waldbüttelbrunn, between Bavarian and Prussian troops.

Twinning arrangements
Waldbütellbrunn is in good contact with the French municipality of Fleury sur Orne in Normandy, with annual visits and student exchanges. The Polish municipality of Radomysl nad Sanem and the Thuringian municipality of Remptendorf are also twinned with Waldbüttelbrunn.

References

Würzburg (district)